Marriaga is a surname of Basque origins. Notable people with the surname include:

Eduar Marriaga, Colombian boxer
Miguel Marriaga (born 1984), Venezuelan basketball player
Miguel Marriaga (born 1986), Colombian boxer

Basque-language surnames